Cigdem Akyol (born October 1978 in Herne) is German journalist and author of Turkish-Kurdish ancestry.

Life 
Akyols parents moved from Turkey to Germany in 1973 and settled in the Ruhr region in Herne. Akyol grew up in Herne, where she attended the Haranni-Gymnasium (high school). After her graduation in 1998 she studied international law and Eastern European history at the University of Cologne. Then she moved to Berlin to attend a journalism school and began working as a journalist. From 2006 to 2014 she worked for Berlin-based national German newspaper Die Tageszeitung, for which she often reported from abroad. In 2014 she accepted a temporary position the Deutsche Presse-Agentur offered in Istanbul. After the completion of her term she remained in Istanbul working as a freelance journalist and book author. 

In 2015 she published a book about Turkey in the 21st century, describing it as a conflicted split society and in 2016 she followed it up with an extensive biography of the Turkish politician and president Recep Tayyip Erdoğan. 

Since 2019 Akyol has been a staff writer at the Swiss weekly WOZ.

Books
Generation Erdogan. Die Türkei – ein zerrissenes Land im 21. Jahrhundert. Kremayr & Scheriau, 2015, 
Erdogan: Die Biografie. Herder, 2016,

References

External links
Official website
Autorin im Porträt: Cigdem Akyol - biographical portrait at kremayr-scheriau.at (German)
"Ich wollte nie in die Türkei" - biography at lokalkompass.de (German, archived version)
Cigdem Akyol at Perlentaucher (German)
Cigdem Akyol - Die Erdogan-Biografin - interview broadcast by ARD (German)

German women journalists
German newspaper journalists
German reporters and correspondents
People from Herne, North Rhine-Westphalia
1978 births
Living people
Die Tageszeitung people